Chromolepida is a genus of stiletto flies in the family Therevidae. There are about five described species in Chromolepida.

Species
These five species belong to the genus Chromolepida:
 Chromolepida bella Cole, 1923
 Chromolepida clavitibia Webb & Irwin, 1995
 Chromolepida mexicana Cole, 1923
 Chromolepida nigra Webb & Irwin, 1995
 Chromolepida pruinosa (Coquillett, 1904)

References

Further reading

 

Therevidae
Articles created by Qbugbot
Asiloidea genera